Araneus is a genus of common orb-weaving spiders. It includes about 650 species, among which are the European garden spider and the barn spider. The genus was erected by Carl Alexander Clerck in 1757.

Description

Spiders of this genus present perhaps the most obvious case of sexual dimorphism among all of the orb-weaver family, with males being normally  to  the size of females. In A. diadematus, for example, last-molt females can reach the body size up to 1 in (2.5 cm), while most males seldom grow over 0.3 in (1 cm), both excluding leg span. Males are differentiated from females by a much smaller and more elongated abdomen, longer legs, and the inability to catch or consume prey bigger than themselves.

In females, the epigyne has a long scape (a tongue-like appendage). Male pedipalps have a hook-like terminal apophysis. Abdominal tubercles are present anterolaterally.

Taxonomic history

Araneus was, for much of its history, called Epeira. The latter name is now considered a junior synonym of Araneus, as the latter was published almost 50 years earlier.

Epeira was first coined by Charles Athanase Walckenaer in 1805, for a range of spiders now considered Araneidae (orb-weavers). Over time, a rather diverse set of spiders was grouped under this genus name, including species from the modern families Araneidae, Mimetidae (Mimetus syllepsicus described by Nicholas Marcellus Hentz in 1832), Tetragnathidae, Theridiidae, Theridiosomatidae (Theridiosoma gemmosum, described by Ludwig Carl Christian Koch in 1877 as Theridion gemmosum), Titanoecidae (Nurscia albomaculata, described by Hippolyte Lucas in 1846 as Epeira albo-maculata) and Uloboridae (Uloborus glomosus, described by Walckenaer in 1842 as Epeira glomosus). Epeira cylindrica O. P.-Cambridge, 1889 was at a time placed in the Linyphiidae and is considered incertae sedis, as is "Araneus" cylindriformis (Roewer, 1942).

Epeira was synonymized with the genus Aranea by William Elford Leach in 1815, and with Araneus by Eugène Simon in 1904, though this synonymy was not universally recognized.

Throughout the 19th century, Epeira was used as a catch-all genus, similar to the once ubiquitous salticid genus Attus. However, from 1911, to its last mention in 1957, only very few authors continued to use the genus in their publications, notably Franganillo (1913, 1918), Hingston (1932), Kaston (1948), and Marples (1957). Chamberlin and Ivie published a new species, Epeira miniata, in 1944, which was rejected.

Jean-Henri Fabre refers to Argiope spiders as Epeira in his 1928 book The Life of the Spider (La Vie des araignées), within the family "Epeirae". James Henry Emerton also uses the genus Epeira in his 1902 book The Common Spiders of the United States, but refers to spiders mostly now considered Araneus. The popular 1893 book American Spiders and their Spinningwork by Henry Christopher McCook also uses Epeira extensively.

The short documentary Epeira diadema (1952) by Italian director Alberto Ancilotto was nominated for an Oscar in 1953. It is about the spider today known as Araneus diadematus.

Venom
Araneus spider venoms vary in toxicity, but often deliver a dry bite (8 of 10 occasions). Females bite more often than males, which would rather flee or feign death.

See also
 List of Araneus species

References

External links

 Image of variations in A. trifolium (from Spider myths)
 Pictures of US Araneus species (free for noncommercial use)
 Pictures of A. trifolium (free for noncommercial use)

 
Araneomorphae genera
Taxa named by Carl Alexander Clerck